Navnit Bham (23 August 1928 – 9 March 2007) was an Indian film director and producer. He directed a number of Hindi and Gujarati films. He was one of the pioneers of Gujarati cinema and set up the first film studio in Gujarat.

References

External links

Hindi-language film directors
1928 births
2007 deaths
Gujarati-language film directors
20th-century Indian film directors